Amblyseius daliensis is a species of mite in the family Phytoseiidae.

References

daliensis
Articles created by Qbugbot
Animals described in 1984